Bifrenaria grandis is an orchid that is normally placed in the genus Bifrenaria. However it has been molecularly determined that the species is actually part of the genus Lacaena. It is endemic to Bolivia.

References

grandis
Endemic flora of Bolivia